Wooburn, or Wooburn and Bourne End, is a civil parish in Buckinghamshire, England. South-east of High Wycombe, it comprises the villages of Wooburn, Wooburn Green and Bourne End and the hamlets of Berghers Hill, Cores End, Hawks Hill, Widmoor and Wooburn Moor. The Buckinghamshire River Wye flows through the area, emptying into the River Thames at Bourne End.

References

External links
 Wooburn and Bourne End Parish Council

Civil parishes in Buckinghamshire
Wycombe District